Veseljko Trivunović (born 13 January 1980) is a Serbian football manager and player.

Club career
Trivunović came through the youth system of Red Star Belgrade, but failed to make his official first team debut. He instead went on loans to several domestic clubs. After his contract expired in 2005, Trivunović joined ČSK Čelarevo, displaying performances that would secure him a move to newly promoted Serbian SuperLiga side Mladost Apatin in 2006. He subsequently spent two seasons at both Vojvodina and OFK Beograd, before moving abroad in 2011.

Following a season in Azerbaijan, Trivunović returned to OFK Beograd in 2012. He also played for Spartak Subotica before joining OFK Bačka in 2014. During his four and a half seasons with the club, Trivunović helped them earn promotion to the Serbian SuperLiga for the first time ever in 2016. He would move to Serbian League Vojvodina side ČSK Čelarevo in the 2019 winter transfer window.

In 2020, Trivunović accepted an offer from Vojvodina League South club Hajduk Divoš. He simultaneously started working with the youth setup at Soko Nova Gajdobra, also taking on a role as first team coach. In 2021, Trivunović became player-manager of Soko Nova Gajdobra, helping them win promotion.

International career
On 12 November 2010, the 30-year-old Trivunović received his first call-up to the Serbia national team by manager Vladimir Petrović, making his debut as a second-half substitute for Nenad Milijaš and providing an assist for Nikola Žigić's winning goal in a 1–0 away friendly win over Bulgaria five days later. He scored his first international goal in his second cap, sealing the 2–0 victory away at Israel on 9 February 2011. In total, Trivunović was capped six times for Serbia.

References

External links
 
 
 

1980 births
Living people
Sportspeople from Banja Luka
Serbs of Bosnia and Herzegovina
Serbia and Montenegro footballers
Serbian footballers
Association football midfielders
Serbia international footballers
Red Star Belgrade footballers
FK Loznica players
FK Jedinstvo Ub players
FK Radnički Obrenovac players
FK ČSK Čelarevo players
FK Mladost Apatin players
FK Vojvodina players
OFK Beograd players
Gabala FC players
FK Spartak Subotica players
OFK Bačka players
Second League of Serbia and Montenegro players
First League of Serbia and Montenegro players
Serbian First League players
Serbian SuperLiga players
Azerbaijan Premier League players
Serbian expatriate footballers
Expatriate footballers in Azerbaijan
Serbian expatriate sportspeople in Azerbaijan
Serbian football managers